Samuil Donkov (born 20 June 1983) is a Bulgarian sports shooter. He competed in the men's 10 metre air pistol event at the 2016 Summer Olympics.

References

External links
 

1983 births
Living people
Bulgarian male sport shooters
Olympic shooters of Bulgaria
Shooters at the 2016 Summer Olympics
Place of birth missing (living people)
European Games competitors for Bulgaria
Shooters at the 2019 European Games
21st-century Bulgarian people